Armitage School is a high school in Janjanbureh, in the Gambia. It was established in 1927 by Governor Cecil Hamilton Armitage in Georgetown. After World War II, the school became a secondary boarding school.

Notable alumni
 Sheriff Dibba, a People's Progressive Party politician of the 1960s and 1970s
 Sheriff Sisay, a People's Progressive Party politician of the 1960s and 1970s

See also

 Education in the Gambia
 List of boarding schools
 List of schools in the Gambia
 List of alumni of Armitage High School

References

1920s establishments in the Gambia
1927 establishments in Africa
Boarding schools in the Gambia
Educational institutions established in 1927
High schools and secondary schools in the Gambia
Janjanbureh
1927 establishments in the British Empire